T Bone N Weasel is a 1992 television film directed by Lewis Teague and starring Gregory Hines and Christopher Lloyd.  It is based on Jon Klein's 1986 play of the same name.

Cast
Gregory Hines as T Bone
Christopher Lloyd as William "Weasel" Weasler
Ned Beatty as Doc Tatum
Rip Torn as Happy Sam
Graham Jarvis as Mr. Fergus
Wayne Knight as Roy Kramp
Rusty Schwimmer as Verna Mae
Larry Hankin as Rev. Gluck
Sam Whipple as Raincoat
Candy Aston as Mom on Beach
Denise S. Bass as Waitress
J. Michael Hunter as Foreman
Lloyd Wilson as Eviction Officer

References

External links
 
 

1992 films
Films directed by Lewis Teague
Television shows based on plays
1992 television films
1990s English-language films
TNT Network original films